Harcha Hassan Arena is an indoor sporting arena located in Algiers, Algeria. The capacity of the arena is 8,000 spectators. It hosts indoor sporting events such as Handball, Basketball, Volleyball and hosts the home matches of GS Pétroliers. It also hosted many international competitions.

Competitions hosted
Some of major senior competitions are below
Pan Arab Games
1 time (2004)
Mediterranean Games
1 time (1975)
All-Africa Games
2 times (1978 & 2007)
African Handball Championship
4 times (Men's & Women's 1976, Men's & Women's 1989, Men's & Women's 2000 & Men's & Women's 2014)
FIBA Africa Championship
2 times (Men's 1995 & Men's 2005)
African Volleyball Championship
1 time (Men's 1993)
Vovinam World Championships
1  time Vovinam World Championship 2015

References

External links
Stadium information

Indoor arenas in Algeria
Sports venues in Algiers
Volleyball venues in Algeria
Basketball venues in Algeria
Handball venues in Algeria
Badminton venues
Badminton in Algeria
Sports venues completed in 1975